Billy Baxter OAM (born c. 1959) is an Australian radio presenter and musician from Geelong. He is a co-presenter of the Australian rules football program Coodabeen Champions on 774 ABC Melbourne, alongside Jeff Richardson, Ian Cover, Jeff "Torch" McGee, Simon Whelan, Andy Bellairs and Greg Champion. As a musician, Baxter was the lead vocalist of Ghetto Blasters, Big Fans of Jesus, the Hollow Men and has also worked as a solo artist. The Hollow Men issued two albums on Au Go Go Records, Broken Stuff (1988) and So Long (1990). Baxter's solo albums are Holler (1991) and Speedhump, Thump (1994).

Biography

Musical career
Billy Baxter was born in 1958 or 1959 and grew up in Geelong, where his parents ran a local milk bar. He played football for the Geelong Under 19s as a rover. In October 1980, Australian rock band, Paul Kelly & the Dots had issued a single, "Billy Baxter" where Kelly sang that "I want to be like Billy Baxter and do imitations, Billy's got a thousand faces, he's a lover and a gambler too". He was a vocalist for Ghetto Blasters from 1982 to 1984 with Archie Cuthbertson, Kevin Fleming, Don Morrison and Nigel Sweeting. Baxter and Fleming then formed Big Fans of Jesus (1984–1985) with Allan Brooker, Ian Hill and Steve Watson. They released a Live album in April. Later in 1985 Baxter formed the folk pop group The Hollow Men with Mal Stanley on vocals, guitar and organ (ex-Burning Souls), Jon Von Goes on guitar, Danny Butler on bass guitar and Paul Johnstone on drums. The group issued two albums on Au Go Go Records, Broken Stuff (1988) and So Long (1990). In the 1991 comedy film, Spotswood, Baxter and The Hollow Men appear as a rock group, the Cicadas. However the group had disbanded before the film's release. Baxter released his debut solo album, Holler (1991) and followed with Speedhump, Thump (1994). In April 1998 Baxter covered "(They Long to Be) Close to You" for the tribute album, To Hal and Bacharach, by various Australian artists. In December 2010, The Hollow Men had reformed to perform Broken Stuff live on air.

Radio presenter

In 1982, Baxter started an alternate career in radio, initially as a DJ on Melbourne community radio station 3RRR. The Ages Jenny Brown felt the program displayed "[a] patchwork of rarely heard records and off-the-wall novelty tracks" and Baxter was described as "not terrificly tall but the frontman of a rock band in rehearsal". Baxter then worked for Australian Broadcasting Corporation (ABC's) 3LO on the Sunday Night Live show. After his stint on 3LO he became a long term member of Coodabeens Footy Show on Radio National via 774 ABC Melbourne. The current sports events program is co-presented by Jeff Richardson, Ian Cover and Greg Champion. Baxter also selects music for the show. In 2003, the program's comedy team Coodabeen Champions released a 2× CD compilation album, A Coodabeens Collection.

Discography
Releases by Big Fans of Jesus, The Hollow Men or solo.

Albums
Big Fans of Jesus
 Live – (April 1985)

The Hollow Men
 Broken Stuff – (Au Go Go Records, 1988)
 So Long – (Au Go Go Records, 1990)

Solo
 Holler – (Au Go Go Records, 1991)
 Speedhump, Thump – (Chip Chop/MDS, 1994)

Coodabeen Champions
 A Coodabeens Collection – (Australian Broadcasting Corporation, 2003)
 The Coodabeen Champions Present Sunday Nightingales – (Australian Broadcasting Corporation, 2007)

Extended plays
The Hollow Men
 Blue Trains and Gravel Lanes  – (Rampant, 1986)
 This Is Cactus Land – (1988)
 Live and Otherwise – (1988)

Singles
The Hollow Men
 "Human Wreck" – (1990)
 "My Pal" – (1990)

Solo
 "It's Too Late to Turn Back Now" (1987)
 "To Love Somebody" (1988)

References 

1959 births
Living people
Australian male singers
ABC radio (Australia) journalists and presenters
Australian songwriters
Musicians from Victoria (Australia)
Radio personalities from Melbourne
Au Go Go Records artists
Musicians from Geelong